Gomphidia bredoi is a species of dragonfly in the family Gomphidae. It is found in Angola, the Democratic Republic of the Congo, Ivory Coast, Ghana, Nigeria, and Uganda. Its natural habitats are subtropical or tropical moist lowland forests and rivers. It is threatened by habitat loss.

References

Gomphidae
Taxonomy articles created by Polbot
Insects described in 1934